Webb Hill is a hill located in St. George, Utah, in Washington County. The hill houses numerous radio and television tower facilities that serve the local area. The hill's geology is common with the surrounding region. In 1998, the skeletal remains of a male were found on the mountain.

Geology
As with the surrounding area, soil and rock formations on Webb Hill are red in appearance due to the presence of iron oxide. Although portions of the older section of the city of St. George (particularly the southern part near the Virgin River) lie on floodplain alluvium, much of the city is built directly upon Jurassic, Triassic, and Permian period sedimentary bedrock. This includes Webb Hill. At its highest point, the hill reaches  in elevation.

Radio
Multiple lower power and booster stations broadcast from the hill, a full list of which can be found here.
Given these stations are translators and lower power stations, their coverage of the region is limited. Full power stations in St. George transmit from Seegmiller Mountain, 17 miles south of town in Arizona.

Television
Along with radio station transmitters, the hill is home to numerous television stations. The two best known stations are KMYU (digital channel 9) and KUEW (digital channel 18). KMYU is a full service television station while KUEW is a satellite of KUED (PBS) from Salt Lake City. All stations on the list appearing 2.9 miles away from St. George are in fact broadcasting from within the city on Webb Hill. In total 17 television stations (most of them low power) broadcast from the mountain. However, due to the national digital television transition, several of the analog translator stations were shut off.

Internet
Along with radio and television station transmitters, Webb Hill is home to one of the local high speed internet providers' transmitters in St. George.

References

External links
 Case File 692UMUT.The Doe Network.
 St. George and Surrounding Areas @ RTLI
 Saint George, Utah TV Translators
 UEN Washington County Translators
 ABC4 (KTVX) Translator list

Mountains of Utah
Mountains of Washington County, Utah
St. George, Utah